Richard Thomas Herd Jr. (September 26, 1932 – May 26, 2020) was an American actor, appearing in numerous supporting, recurring, and guest roles in television series and occasional film roles, from the 1970s to the 2010s. He was well known in the science fiction community for his role in the 1983 NBC miniseries V and 1984 sequel V: The Final Battle, as John, the Visitors' Supreme Commander. Other major roles in his career included recurring parts on the NBC series seaQuest DSV as Admiral William Noyce; on Star Trek: Voyager as Admiral Owen Paris, the father of helmsman Tom Paris; and as George Costanza's boss Matt Wilhelm on Seinfeld. In two guest appearances on Quantum Leap, he played children's show host "Captain Galaxy", a would-be time traveler, and a miner named Ziggy Ziganovich. He also voiced Father Elijah in the Dead Money DLC for Fallout: New Vegas. Herd appeared at a number of fan conventions for his science fiction roles.

Early life
Herd was born in Boston, the son of Katherine (Lydon) and Richard Herd Sr., a train engineer who died while serving in the Army during World War II.

Herd was drafted during the Korean War, injuring his knee during basic training. He went on to serve in the United States Army Ordnance Corps and was honorably discharged. He then worked in Long Island, New York for the United States Army Signal Corps as a civilian actor, along with Robert Ludlum, making Army training films.

Career
Herd started out his career as an actor on the New York stage. He made his film debut in Hercules in New York (1970). Herd's first major film role was in the thriller The China Syndrome alongside Jane Fonda, Jack Lemmon and Michael Douglas, where he played the character Evan McCormack, the corrupt Chairman of the California Gas & Electric Board. This role helped make him well known outside the United States. He portrayed James W. McCord, Jr. in the Academy Award-winning All the President's Men (1976).

In addition to science fiction, he was a regular as Captain Dennis Sheridan on T. J. Hooker from 1982 to 1983 (he continued to appear on the series sporadically until 1984), and appeared on Seinfeld as Mr. Wilhelm, George Costanza's boss at the Yankees. Guest appearances included M*A*S*H, The Rockford Files, The Feather and Father Gang, The Golden Girls, Starsky & Hutch, Quantum Leap, The A-Team, Midnight Caller, Hart to Hart, NYPD Blue, Renegade, Pacific Blue, and JAG.

In 2012 he played Judge Paul Landsman in the TV series CSI: Miami episode "Rest in Pieces". Herd portrayed Roman Armitage in Get Out (2017).

Recognition
Herd was inducted into the National Broadcaster Hall of Fame for his work in Old Time Radio.

Herd served as the third National Vice President of the Screen Actors Guild.

Personal life and death
Herd lived in Los Angeles with his wife of 40 years, Patricia Crowder Herd. He died at his home from complications of colon cancer on May 26, 2020, aged 87.

Filmography

References

External links

Interview with Richard Herd & The Enterprise Blues Band on Slice of SciFi
Blankman Inc Interviews Richard Herd
Interview in Patriot Ledger, July, 2015

1932 births
2020 deaths
20th-century American male actors
21st-century American male actors
American male film actors
American male television actors
Deaths from cancer in California
Deaths from colorectal cancer
Male actors from Boston
Military personnel from Massachusetts
United States Army civilians
United States Army soldiers